Åke Magnus Valdemar Sjölin (26 August 1910 – 19 October 1999) was a Swedish diplomat.

Career
Sjölin was born in Lindesberg, Sweden, the son of mayor Magnus Sjölin and his wife Svea (née Rehnvall). He passed studentexamen in Lund in 1928 and received a Candidate of Law degree from Stockholm University College in 1933. Sjölin completed his clerkship in Linde's and Medelstad's Judicial District from 1934 to 1936 before becoming an attaché at the Ministry for Foreign Affairs in 1937. He served in Chicago in 1938, in Washington, D.C. in 1939 and then in Buenos Aires in 1942. Sjöliv served as second legation secretary in Buenos Aires in 1943 and first secretary at the Foreign Ministry in 1945. Sjölin was director there in 1950 and embassy counsellor in Oslo from 1952 to 1957.

He then ambassador in Beirut, Damascus and Amman from 1957 to 1958 and in Beirut and Amman from 1958 to 1960. Sjölin was ambassador in Addis Ababa and Khartoum from 1960 to 1964 and also in Mogadishu and Tananarive from 1961 to 1964. Sjölin then moved to Asia where we was ambassador in Bangkok, Rangoon, Kuala Lumpur and Saigon from 1964 to 1967 and also in Vientiane from 1965 to 1967 and in Singapore from 1966 to 1967. Sjölin became the last Swedish ambassador in South Vietnam in 1967 and Sweden did not seek agrément for a replacement of Sjölin because the Swedish outlook towards the regime in Saigon. Sjölin was appointed consul general in Berlin in 1967 and stayed in that position until 1972. He was then ambassador in Rabat, Nouakchott, Dakar and Banjul from 1972 to 1976.

Personal life
In 1946, Sjölin married Maud Selander (born 1921), the daughter of managing director Hjalmar Selander and Märta (née Russel). He is the father of the professor of medical psychology at the Karolinska Institutet, Åsa Nilsonne (born 1949) and Magnus (born 1952). After retiring, Sjölin moved back home to Sweden and to the town of Grillby. Sjölin died on 19 October 1999 in Husby-Sjutolft in Enköping Municipality where he was living. He was buried in Husby-Sjutolft's cemetery.

Awards and decorations
Sjölin's awards:
Knight of the Order of the Polar Star
Grand Cordon of the Order of Independence
Grand Cordon of the National Order of the Cedar
Commander of the Order of Merit
Commander of the Order of the Aztec Eagle
Commander of the Order of St. Olav
Commander of the Order of Isabella the Catholic
Officer of the Order of the Southern Cross
Ethiopian Red Cross Medal

References

1910 births
1999 deaths
Consuls-general of Sweden
Ambassadors of Sweden to Lebanon
Ambassadors of Sweden to Syria
Ambassadors of Sweden to Jordan
Ambassadors of Sweden to Ethiopia
Ambassadors of Sweden to Sudan
Ambassadors of Sweden to Somalia
Ambassadors of Sweden to Madagascar
Ambassadors of Sweden to Thailand
Ambassadors of Sweden to Myanmar
Ambassadors of Sweden to Malaysia
Ambassadors of Sweden to Vietnam
Ambassadors of Sweden to Laos
Ambassadors of Sweden to Singapore
Ambassadors of Sweden to Morocco
Ambassadors of Sweden to Mauritania
Ambassadors of Sweden to Senegal
Ambassadors of Sweden to the Gambia
People from Lindesberg Municipality
Knights of the Order of the Polar Star
Stockholm University alumni